Zoran Todorovski (Macedonian: Зоран Тодоровски) was a historian from North Macedonia. Todorovski has criticized the Macedonian historiography as selective and one-sided.

Biography 
Zoran Todorovski was born in Skopje, SFR Yugoslavia on March 3, 1950. He graduated in history from the University of Skopje in 1972. He defended his master's degree in 1981 and his doctorate in 1981. In the course of his working career he worked in the Republican Committee for Culture (1975-1990) and in the Institute of National History (1990-1999). From 1999 to 2002 he was director of the State Archives of the Republic of Macedonia, and from 2002 to 2006 he worked again at the Institute of National History. From 2006 until his death on 5 March 2015 he was again a director of the State Archives of then Republic of Macedonia.
Zoran Todorovski is the author of over a hundred scientific papers, of which twenty books and collections of documents, over 50 articles and appendices, 25 feuilletons and 33 historiographical additions to the periodical. He also participated in a number of international conferences. In cooperation with the State Archives of Bulgaria he published the diary of Krste Misirkov. Todorovski advocated for the rehabilitation of Todor Alexandrov and Ivan Mihailov  from the historiography in North Macedonia.

References

Macedonian academics
Writers from Skopje
Macedonian historians
Ss. Cyril and Methodius University of Skopje alumni
Ethnic Macedonian people
Historical revisionism
1950 births
2015 deaths